Joan of Leeds or Johannas de Ledes was an English nun, who, bored with her monastic and enclosed life, at some point in 1318 escaped from St Clement's by York priory to journey to Beverley, where she was accused of living with a man. To escape, she feigned mortal illness and constructed a dummy of herself, which her colleagues buried in holy ground. When the Archbishop of York, William Melton, heard of this, he wrote to the religious authorities in Beverley expounding upon Joan's faults and instructing that she be returned forthwith to St Clement's. It is not recorded whether she ever did return, and all that is known of her life and career come from three letters found in Melton's archepiscopal cartulary.

Escape from the nunnery
Joan of Leeds was resident in St Clement's by York (also known as Clementhorpe)  a Benedictine nunnery in the early years of the 14th century. All that is known of her life comes from three letters copied into a registrum of the Archbishop of York, which scholars believe to be copies of Melton's original letters. One of these letters made the news in 2019.  Two more, previously unknown letters about Joan, were discovered in 2020.

In 1318, tired of her enclosed life, Joan faked a mortal illness and then her own death. She created a dummy "in the likeness of her body", to be buried instead of her corpse. A number of Joan's fellow nuns appear to have aided and abetted her plan, although it is less certain whether they did so willingly or were tricked into helping her. Believing—or pretending to believe—her to be dead, and perhaps being deceived by the dummy, they buried it as her "in a sacred space amongst the religious of that place", wrote Archbishop Melton. Joan's motives for escaping the nunnery are unknown, but the Archbishop put it down to a desire to follow "the way of carnal lust", which she was unable to do in orders having taken vows of poverty and chastity.

When this became known, it caused a scandal locally. Melton instructed her to return to her priory, and she was denounced as an apostate for voluntarily absconding. In a letter to the Dean of Beverley, Melton wrote:

Whether she ever did return remains unknown, and it is possible that the Archbishop considered that he had fulfilled his duty in demanding she return without actually taking steps to ensure that his edict was enforced. However, a letter to Melton from a local priest, dated 26 August 1318, informed the Archbishop that she had approached the priest with her record of events, specifically confirming that she had faked her death in order to abscond.

Overview
Joan was not the first fugitive nun that St Clements by York had had to deal with. In 1301, another nun known only as Cecily had met a group of mounted men by the priory gate; throwing off her habit, she put on an ordinary gown and escaped to Darlington where she lived with one Gregory de Thornton for the next three years. In 1310 one of the nuns, Joan de Saxton, had been punished by Archbishop William Greenfield for unknown offences, but which, according to the historian Eileen Power, had probably involved immorality. Although the punishment was subsequently reduced, Greenfield wrote to the Prioress, Agnes de Methelay, laying out certain conditions for Joan de Saxton's future conduct. Among other restrictions, she could not leave the cloister except when accompanied by other nuns. She was forbidden from receiving visitors, and from having anything to do with one Lady de Walleys: if de Walleys visited Clementhorpe, de Saxton "was to be sent away before Pentecost". For her part, the prioress was forbidden to employ girls over the age of 12 in the priory except when absolutely unavoidable. Only the year before Joan of Leeds' escape Melton had instructed the priory that "the frequent access of men and women to the house was not to be allowed, lest evil or scandal should arise". Problems continued at Clementhorpe, however; in 1318, Melton rebuked the priory for failing to enforce appropriate silence in the cloister, and, following further issues with troublesome nuns, de Methelay resigned as Prioress in 1324.

Historical significance

The story of Joan of Leeds came to light in 2019, when a research project at the University of York's Borthwick Institute for Archives—headed by Professor Sarah Rees Jones—examining the Registra of the Archbishops of York for 1305–1405 uncovered the scribe's notes on the Archbishop's monition. The scribal notation is likely to be a copy of the Archbishop's letter to the Dean of Beverley. The books would accompany each Archbishop on his peripatetic travels through the Archiepiscopate, and contained everything from accounts of pensions and grants to the ordinations he carried out. 

Rees Jones described Joan's tale as "extraordinary—like a Monty Python sketch", noting, however, that we do not know what came of her or her case with Melton. This was not, Jones said, unusual: "there are several cases of 'runaway' monks and nuns from various religious houses in the registers. But we don’t always get as much detail as this, and we don’t always have the full story. Women often entered convents in adolescence, and such changes of heart about their vocation were not uncommon". Modern commentators have described Joan of Leeds as "rebellious" and "racy".

Fictional portrayal
In July 2019 The Stage announced that the story of Joan of Leeds would be performed at the New Diorama Theatre, London, in December that year, describing it as an "alternative Christmas show". The historical novelist Candace Robb centred her 1995 book A Nun's Tale around the story of Joan of Leeds, although she moved the chronology to a period later in the 14th century.

Notes

References

Bibliography 

 
 
 
 
 
 
 
 
 
 
 
 
 
 
 
 
 

Date of birth unknown
Date of death unknown
Year of birth unknown
Year of death unknown
14th-century English nuns
People from York
People who faked their own death